The Macintosh LC III is a personal computer designed, manufactured, and sold by Apple Computer from February 1993 to February 1994. It replaced the commercially successful Macintosh LC II in Apple's lineup of mid-class computers, and was significantly faster, with MacWorld Magazine benchmarks showing 2x performance in all major categories - CPU, disk, video and maths.  It was also significantly less expensive; the LC III with an 80 MB hard disk was priced at US$1,349 at introduction, $700 less than the LC II.  The LC III was sold primarily (but not exclusively) to educational institutions, and a corresponding Performa variant called the Performa 450 was sold to the consumer market.

A speed-bumped version, called the Macintosh LC III+ was released in October of the same year, with a 33 MHz CPU.  Three Performa variants of this model were released: the 460, 466 and 467. These faster models replaced the LC III and Performa 450, with sales of the original models continuing until the end of 1993 as dealers depleted their stocks. New sales of the LC III+ ended in early 1994 as Apple neared the completion of the transition away from 68030 processors. The 68LC040-based LC 475 and Performa 475 were their replacements.

Models 

Introduced February 10, 1993:
 Macintosh LC III: 25 MHz 68030 CPU, 80 MB HDD.
 Macintosh Performa 450: 25 MHz 68030 CPU, 120 MB HDD.

Introduced October 18, 1993:
 Macintosh LC III+: 33 MHz 68030 CPU.
 Macintosh Performa 460: 4 MB RAM, 80 MB HDD.
 Macintosh Performa 466: 4 MB RAM, 160 MB HDD.
 Macintosh Performa 467: 4 MB RAM, 160 MB HDD.

Timeline

References

External links 

 Mac LC III and Mac LC III+ at lowendmac.com.

III
LC III
LC III
Computer-related introductions in 1993